Morgan–Hueston House is a registered historic building in Fairfield, Ohio, listed in the National Register on 1 October 1990.

Historic uses 
Single Dwelling

Notes 

Houses on the National Register of Historic Places in Ohio
Houses in Butler County, Ohio
National Register of Historic Places in Butler County, Ohio
Fairfield, Ohio